Jaugiliai is a village in Kėdainiai district municipality, in Kaunas County, in central Lithuania. According to the 2011 census, the village had a population of 57 people. It is located on the shore of the Jaugiliai Lake, by the Jaugila river.

At the beginning of the 20th century Jaugiliai was an estate and okolica, a property of the Malinavičiai, Valatkos ir Savičiai and Liudkevičiai families.

Demography

References

Villages in Kaunas County
Kėdainiai District Municipality